Tylecodon buchholzianus is a species of succulent plant in the genus Tylecodon belonging to the family Crassulaceae.

Description
Tylecodon buchholzianus is a shrub reaching a height of about 20–30 cm. It is a winter slow-growing plant, dormant during the summer. The stem is a swollen and thickened caudex with a diameter up to 30 cm and many elongate whitish or grey branches. In the Spring arise almost cylindrical green leaves, about 10 cm long, but the photosynthesis may be granted also by microscopic leaflets on the stem. Flowers are pale pink, have recurved lobes and emerge from  tubes on short petioles. Flowering period extends from January to late Spring.

Distribution
This species is native to Namaqualand in South Africa and Namibia.

Subspecies
 Tylecodon buchholzianus var. buchholzianus
 Tylecodon buchholzianus var. fasciculatus

References
 Cactus-art
 Bihrmann
 Crassulaceae

buchholzianus